Milan Marcetta (September 19, 1936 – September 18, 2014) was a Canadian professional ice hockey player who played 54 games in the National Hockey League with the Toronto Maple Leafs and Minnesota North Stars between 1967 and 1969. The rest of his career, which lasted from 1956 to 1973, was spent in the minor leagues. He only played three games in the finals in 1967 for Toronto, but earned the right to have his name engraved on the Stanley Cup. He died the day before his 78th birthday, on September 18, 2014.

Career statistics

Regular season and playoffs

References

External links
 

1936 births
2014 deaths
Buffalo Bisons (AHL) players
Canadian expatriate ice hockey players in the United States
Canadian ice hockey centres
Canadian people of Serbian descent
Ice hockey people from Alberta
Memphis South Stars players
Minnesota North Stars players
People from Yellowhead County
Rochester Americans players
Sault Thunderbirds players
Springfield Indians players
Stanley Cup champions
St. Louis Braves (EPHL) players
Toronto Maple Leafs players
Tulsa Oilers (1964–1984) players
Victoria Maple Leafs players
Yorkton Terriers players